The Laona and Northern Railway (reporting marks LNO) is a heritage railroad in Laona, Wisconsin.

History
A former freight railroad, it was incorporated in 1902 for the R. Connor Company of Marshfield, Wisconsin, to haul lumber to its mill in Laona and then transport it to the Soo Line interchange 8 miles north in Laona Junction. 

When the railway converted to diesel in the mid-1950s, the company held on to only one steam locomotive, No. 4 or 4 Spot, for reserve power and burning weeds from the rail line. By 1965 the Connor Company used the locomotive for mixed trains to Laona Junction, taking passengers on a -hour ride. In 1983 the Connor Company gave the Laona and Northern No. 4 to the Camp 5 historical society, and it now pulls the Lumberjack Steam Train to the Camp Five Museum.

See also
List of heritage railroads in the United States

External links
Lumberjack Steam Train - official website

References

Heritage railroads in Wisconsin
Defunct Wisconsin railroads
Transportation in Forest County, Wisconsin